Omutinsky District  is an administrative district (raion), one of the twenty-two in Tyumen Oblast, Russia. As a municipal division, it is incorporated as Omutinsky Municipal District. It is located in the south of the oblast. Its administrative center is the rural locality (a selo) of Omutinskoye. Population: 19,608 (2010 Census);  The population of Omutinskoye accounts for 46.9% of the district's total population.

References

Notes

Sources

Districts of Tyumen Oblast